BUT is a French brand of retail stores specialized in home goods, including furniture, large and small appliances, and consumer electronics.

History 
The BUT brand was created in 1972 by André Venturini in Le Havre, France. With his son Michel, he rapidly expanded his network by using franchising. In 1982, there were 140 BUT stores, and in 2015, 280.

In 1987, Carrefour became a major shareholder of BUT; it sold its shares in 1993. In 1997, BUT was bought by the English company Kingfisher, which made it part of Kingfisher Electricals.

Since 31 March 2008, BUT has been owned to Decomeubles Partners, a company held by a consortium of Colony Capital, Goldman Sachs, and OpCapita.

In November 2016, a 50/50 partnership between Austrian furniture retailer XXXLutz Group and Clayton, Dubilier & Rice acquired BUT.

In July 2020, BUT acquired the French branches of Conforama.

Sectors 
BUT stores offer three types of goods:
 Furniture and home decoration, especially living room, bedroom, and kitchen
 Home appliances, both major appliances and small appliances.
 Audio-visual

Fidem is the company that manages the BUT card.

Slogan 
Current: But, c'est NOUS ! 'BUT is us!'
Previously: "Vous êtes bien chez BUT" 'You're comfortable at BUT'; "On s'y retrouve tous!" 'Everyone meets at BUT'; "Choisissez bien, choisissez BUT" 'Choose well, choose BUT'; "Le juste prix" 'The right price'.

From 1989 to 2001, BUT was the official partner of the TV game Le Juste Prix (the French version of The Price Is Right), whence its slogan 'Le juste prix'.

References

External links 
 Official site

French brands
Retail companies established in 1972
1972 establishments in France